The Cotahuasi Subbasin Landscape Reserve is a protected area in Peru located in the Arequipa Region, La Unión Province.  It protects part of the Central Andean puna and Sechura Desert ecoregions.

See also 
 Cotahuasi Canyon
 Mawk'allaqta
 Natural and Cultural Peruvian Heritage

References

External links 
 www.aedes.com.pe / Images of plants in the Cotahuasi Subbasin Landscape Reserve (Spanish)

Geography of Arequipa Region
Protected areas established in 2005
Landscape reserves of Peru
2005 establishments in Peru